Luis Antonio Méndez Gómez (born 18 May 1959) is a Uruguayan sports shooter. He competed in the men's 10 metre air pistol event at the 2000 Summer Olympics. He won a gold, silver and bronze medal at the 1986 South American Games, then a silver medal at the 2006 edition.

References

External links
 

1959 births
Living people
Uruguayan male sport shooters
Olympic shooters of Uruguay
Shooters at the 2000 Summer Olympics
Pan American Games bronze medalists for Uruguay
Pan American Games medalists in shooting
Medalists at the 1987 Pan American Games
Shooters at the 1987 Pan American Games
Shooters at the 1995 Pan American Games
Shooters at the 1999 Pan American Games
Shooters at the 2007 Pan American Games
South American Games gold medalists for Uruguay
South American Games silver medalists for Uruguay
South American Games medalists in shooting
Competitors at the 1986 South American Games
Competitors at the 1994 South American Games
Competitors at the 1998 South American Games
Competitors at the 2006 South American Games
Place of birth missing (living people)
20th-century Uruguayan people
21st-century Uruguayan people